The Canadian Somali Congress (CSC) is a Somali community organization based in Toronto, Ontario.

Overview
Lawyer Ahmed Hussen serves as the CSC's national President.

The body works closely with national and regional authorities to strengthen civic relations. Among other initiatives, the Canadian Somali Congress has formed a partnership with the Canadian International Peace Project and Canadian Jewish Congress to establish the Canadian Somali-Jewish Mentorship Project, the first national mentoring and development project between a sizable Muslim community and the Jewish community.

See also
Somali Youth Coalition

Notes

References
CSC - About us

External links
Canadian Somali Congress

Somali Canadian
International friendship associations
Organizations based in Toronto